Węgliniec is a railway station in the town of Węgliniec, Lower Silesia, Poland.

History
After the end of the Second World War, eastern Upper Lusatia and Kohlfurt came under Polish administration. Until September 6, 1947, Kohlfurt and the train station were called Kaławsk. Since September 1947, the city and train station have been named Węgliniec. The Polish State Railways took over the station facilities after the end of the war. The electrical contact wire on the route to Lubań fell under the Soviet reparation requirements and was dismantled. The second track of the railway line to Żary was dismantled.

On the north side of the train station, an extensive marshalling yard with 18 through tracks and three stump tracks each was built on the east and west sides. Depending on the destination, the freight trains could be dismantled from one run-off mountain in the east and west. An operator tower was built for the western drain mountain, from which the remote-controlled track brakes could be controlled. The southern ten tracks were integrated into the routes and have exit signals to the east. The importance of the drainage peaks at the exit to Lauban and in the central southeast area decreased sharply.

In 1966 passenger services on the small train to Czerwona Woda were discontinued. The route and the siding to the former pit city of Görlitz (Polish: Zielonka) were closed in the mid-1970s.

The electric contact wire did not reach Węgliniec until 1985, this time coming from Legnica (Liegnitz). The electrical railway operation on the railway line to Lubań followed in 1987. In order to implement the German-Polish agreement on the "further development of the railway connections Berlin - Warsaw  and Dresden - Wrocław (E 30 / CE 30)" 2008 also electrified the remnant between Węgliniec and the eastern bridgehead of the Neißebrücke near Horka. The railway lines towards Wrocław, Görlitz and Horka were also modernized as part of the agreement.

Buildings

Train services
Train services are operated by Przewozy Regionalne, PKP Intercity and Koleje Dolnośląskie.

Until mid-December 2014 the station was also served by EuroCity "Wawel", which used to run once daily between Berlin Hauptbahnhof and Wrocław Główny. The station is served by Express Intercity, Łużyce" from Warszawa Wschodnia.

The station is served by the following service(s):

 Intercity services (IC) Zgorzelec - Legnica - Wrocław - Ostrów Wielkopolski - Łódź - Warszawa
Regional services (R) Goerlitz (Görlitz station) - Żary - Zielona Góra Główna

References

External links
 
 Przewozy Regionalne website 

Railway stations in Lower Silesian Voivodeship
Zgorzelec County
Railway stations in Poland opened in 1846